A somatomammotroph or somatomammotrophic cell, also known as a somatolactotroph or somatolactotrophic cell, is a type of cell of the anterior pituitary gland that produces both somatotropin (growth hormone) and prolactin. Cells that secrete only somatotropin or only prolactin are known as somatotrophs and mammotrophs, respectively. 

Approximately 15-20% of the cells in the normal pituitary gland are somatomammotrophs.

See also 

 Acidophil cell

List of human cell types derived from the germ layers

References 

Peptide hormone secreting cells
Human cells
Histology